Northern City Islands are a group of islands in the archipelago of Bahrain, lying  west of the capital, Manama, on Bahrain Island.

Description
The proposed plan for the city was made in 2000. 
It is a residential area that is being reclaimed and constructed by the Ministry of Housing in Bahrain. The core of the project involves more than 4,100 housing units, of which 3,110 are social housing units. The project costs about BD208 million ($551.7 million), started in January 2012 and is expected to complete in January 2018.
in June 2014 work on phase 2 began  by Aresco and Tamkon 
in May 2015 work on phase 4 began, as mentioned in this article 
in February 2016 work on phase 4 began, by SSH Holdings, on islands 13–14 on the eastern part.

Education
The islands have the new Bahrain University.

Administration
The island belongs to Northern Governorate.

Transportation
There are two causeways connecting Northern City with Bahrain Island:
 Jid al Haj Bridge
 Diraz Bridge
A future causeway called the Gulf Drive will connect the islands to Muharraq Island through all reclaimed islands in the north.

Image gallery

See also 

 List of islands of Bahrain

References

Populated places in the Northern Governorate, Bahrain
Artificial islands of Bahrain
Islands of Bahrain
Islands of the Persian Gulf